Stanley Alexander (17 September 1905 – 5 June 1961) was a professional footballer who played as inside forward. He was born in Percy Main, North Tyneside, England.

The Hull Daily Mail reported "A third addition to the City playing ranks is Stanley Alexander, a 19 year old inside right from the Percy Main club. Alexander, who is an English schoolboy international, weighs 10 1/2 stone and stands 5ft. 9in. The boy is well recommended and was anxious to join his former club companion, Charlie Lloyd, a full back, who joined Hull City at the end of last season and has been retained."

The match report by "Veritas" on Hull City's 4–2 win over Reading, describes Alexander, who scored twice, taking his season's tally to eleven league and four cup goals, as of considerable value and a nugget that is paying for being polished up.

Stan Alexander, inside forward of Percy Main, who has been with Tottenham Hotspur during the last two seasons, has signed on for Accrington Stanley. Starting with Percy Main Amateurs F.C., Alexander had spells with Hull City and Bradford City before joining Millwall in September 1933. In June 1936 he was transferred from Millwall to Tottenham Hotspur.

Alexander's activity benefitted the clubs:
Percy Main Amateurs,
Hull City,
Bradford City where he scored 23 goals in 61 games,
Millwall,
Tottenham Hotspur in London;
Accrington Stanley in the region of North West England

References

1905 births
1961 deaths
Footballers from Newcastle upon Tyne
English footballers
Association football inside forwards
Percy Main Amateurs F.C. players
Hull City A.F.C. players
Bradford City A.F.C. players
Millwall F.C. players
Tottenham Hotspur F.C. players
Accrington Stanley F.C. (1891) players
English Football League players
People from Percy Main
Footballers from Tyne and Wear